Chen Minyi (born 1 October 1990) is a Chinese Paralympic archer. She won the gold medal in the women's individual W1 event at the 2020 Summer Paralympics held in Tokyo, Japan. She also won the gold medal in the mixed team W1 event.

References

External links 
 

Living people
1990 births
Chinese female archers
Paralympic archers of China
Paralympic gold medalists for China
Paralympic medalists in archery
Archers at the 2020 Summer Paralympics
Medalists at the 2020 Summer Paralympics
Place of birth missing (living people)